North Central Province was an electorate of the Victorian Legislative Council (Australia). It was created in the redistribution of provinces in 1882 when the Central and Eastern Provinces were abolished. The new North Central Province, South Yarra, North Yarra, South Eastern and Melbourne Provinces were then created.

North Central Province was created and defined by the Legislative Council Act 1881 (taking effect from the 1882 elections) as consisting of the following divisions: McIvor, Heathcote, Pyalong, Kyneton, Glenlyon, Metcalfe, Strathfieldsaye, Mount Alexander, Mount Franklin, Newstead, Maldon, Castlemaine, Chewton and Daylesford.

North Central Province was abolished in 1904, with the creation of the new East Yarra, Melbourne East, Melbourne North, Melbourne South and Melbourne West Provinces .

Members for North Central Province

Notes
Fitzgerald and Embling transferred to Southern Province June 1904.
Gray transferred to Bendigo Province June 1904.

References

Former electoral provinces of Victoria (Australia)
1882 establishments in Australia
1904 disestablishments in Australia